A Town Like Alice is a five-hour 1981 Australian television adaptation of Nevil Shute's novel of the same name. Produced by the Seven Network, and directed by David Stevens, it was the second major adaptation of the book.

In the United States it was shown on PBS under the Masterpiece Theatre banner, a rare non-British production to be so aired.

Cast
It stars Helen Morse in the lead role of Jean Paget, with Bryan Brown as Joe Harman and Scottish actor Gordon Jackson as the aging lawyer and trustee Noel Strachan.

Production
It was the most expensive Australian television series at the time. It was filmed on location in England, Malaysia and western New South Wales.

Awards
The series won an International Emmy Award for drama in 1981 and won a Logie Award in the Best Single Drama or Mini Series category at the 1982 awards with Morse, Brown and Jackson winning Logies for their performances.

References

External links
 
A Town Like Alice at Australian Screen Online

1981 television films
1981 films
1980s Australian television miniseries
1981 Australian television series debuts
1981 Australian television series endings
World War II television series
International Emmy Award for Drama winners